Rajan–Nagendra were an Indian musical duo who were prominent composers of film music in Kannada and Telugu cinema from the late 1950s to the early 1990s. Rajan, along with his brother Nagendra, created a niche for themselves for nearly four decades. The duo scored music for about 375 films, over 200 of them in Kannada and the remainder in other languages like Telugu, Tamil, Malayalam, Tulu, Hindi and Sinhala. They composed innumerable hits, hundreds of melodious tunes in their career spanning four decades. They also hold the record for the longest active musical pair in the industry.

Childhood
Rajan (1933–2020) and Nagendrappa (1935–2000)  were born in Shivarampet of Mysore in a middle-class musical family.  Their father Rajappa was a harmonium and flute player who played background music for silent movies.

Within a short time, each of them attained proficiency in playing a different instrument – Rajan in violin and Nagendra in Jal tarang. Rajan used to listen to musical performances of eminent musicians at Choudayya Ramamandira in Mysore and hence got the opportunity to listen to music performances by Hindusthani, Karnatak, and western music in the Mysore palace. Later on Rajan came to Bangalore for his further educational studies.

Early career

In Bangalore Rajan studied in S.L.N. School in the K.R. Market area and later in Central High School. Rajan learnt the violin and appeared at the  state level violin competition, where he secured the first place.

Both Rajan and Nagendra participated in public performances through Jaya Maruthi Orchestra. Meanwhile, Rajan got an offer to go to Madras. He took his brother along with him and they got an opportunity to learn the music trade under the aegis of H. R. Padmanabha Shastri,  who was known for producing talkie movies at that time. This gave them significant exposure to the movie industry.

In 1951, Nagendra returned to Mysore and completed his matriculation. Then he joined P. Kalinga Rao, who was then a famous radio artiste. Within no time, Nagendra got an opportunity to sing for the movie 'Srinivasa Kalyana' along with Hindustani singer Ameer Bai.

Finally, Rajan–Nagendra became independent music directors when they scored music for the film Sowbhagya Lakshmi in 1952. This movie opened the doors of success and they never looked back for more than four decades. After 'Sowbhagya Lakshmi' came Vittalacharya's 'Chanchalakumari', 'Rajalakshmi' and 'Mutthaide Bhagya' in a series to pave the way for these would-be melody kings.

Composers
Rajan used to compose the melodies and set the notations for the orchestra. Nagendra used to dictate the lyrics and tune of the song to the singers.

They had a successful stint in Kannada film industry from early 50s till late 90s, but they started shining from 1973 with Gandhada Gudi songs becoming popular throughout Karnataka and dimmed in early 90s, when new generation music took over thus covering a span of two decades of lilting melodies that has been hugely popular to date in Karnataka and other states of South India.

In the 70s came super hits in a row like Nyayave Devaru, Gandhada Gudi, Devara Gudi, Bhagyavantaru, Eradu Kanasu, Naa Ninna Mareyalaare, Naa Ninna Bidalaare, Hombisilu, Bayalu Daari, Paavana Ganga, Giri Kanye and others.

In the 80s, they made the music for some Telugu films, including Maa Intayana Katha, Puli Bebbuli and Vayyari Bhamalu Vagalamari Bharathulu. They composed the music for about 70 Telugu films.

Further, they kept scoring consistently good music through the 90s and in the course, produced for movies like Mathe Haditu Kogile, Marali Goodige and Suprabhaata. 
They also composed music for a TV serial 'Abhimaana' on Udaya TV.

Rajan–Nagendra made songs in the Rajkumar-Lakshmi  Naa Ninna Mareyalaare and Eradu Kanasu, which starred Rajkumar, Manjula and Kalpana.

Hombisilu, starring Vishnuvardhan, was another big hit.

Rajan–Nagendra also did a series of films starring Anant Nag, and Lakshmi, notable among them being Naa Ninna Bidalaare, Benkiya Bale and Chandanada Gombe.

Naa Ninna Mareyalaare, Gandhada Gudi, Eradu Kanasu—these huge musical hits of the Kannada screen featured the music of Rajan–Nagendra. Their team was exceptionally good at composing cheerful love duets, although they did come up with a couple of sombre numbers like Baadi hoda balliyinda (P. B. Srinivas, Eradu Kanasu).

The lyricists who wrote unforgettable lyrics for them are late Hunasur Krishna Murthy, Uday Shankar, Vijiya Narasimha, Geetha Priya, Dodda Range Gowda, Vyasa Rao and many more. The prominent Telugu lyricists are Narayana Reddy, Dasarathi and late Vetoori Sundarama Murthy and many others. The most prominent Tamil lyricists are late Kanna Dasan and many more.

The main male vocalists who enriched the melody of their songs are late Ghantasala, Kala Govindarajan, P. B. Srinivas, Dr. Rajkumar, late Kishore Kumar, Balasubrahmanyam, Jesudas, P. Jayachandran, Rajesh Krishna and many more. The popular female vocalists are Bala Saraswati, Soolamangalam sisters, P. Leela, S. Janaki, Vani Jairam, Rani, L. R. Easwari, P. Susheela, Jikki, Chitra and many more.

Hundreds of Rajan–Nagendra songs were sung by legendary singers P. B. Srinivas, S. Janaki, Dr. Rajkumar, SPB. Almost all of them remain etched as the unforgettable melodies of Kannada Cinema. The love songs of SPB-SJ-Rajan–Nagendra combination are considered to be heavenly. Such everlasting haunting melodies Rajan–Nagendra pair created. The duo is also reported to have introduced another illustrious playback singer K. S. Chitra to the Kannada cinema back in the early 1980s.

Nagendra sang a couple of songs in his five-decade-long career. The most popular was Yaaru yaaru née yaaru for the comedian Narasimharaju. He also sang Nammoora santheli in the Jai Jagadish-Lakshmi starrer Gaalimaatu and Neeliya baninda tareya oorinda from Tony. Somehow his voice was typecast for comic scenes.

The pair directed music for about 400 films, more than 200 in Kannada alone and rest in Telugu, Tamil, Malayalam, Tulu, and Sinhalese.

Most of the hit songs from Kannada movies were remade in Telugu.

Composition
Some unforgettable Rajan–Nagendra numbers:

Kannada:
 Akashave beelali mele from Nyayave Devaru
 Aakaasha deepavu neenu from Pavana Ganga
 Aakaashadinda dharegilida from Chandanada Gombe
 Aaseya bhaava olavina jeeva from Mangalya Bhagya
 Aalaya Mrugalaya from Mrugalaya
 Aralutide moha from Nanobba Kalla
 Baanallu neene bhuviyallu neene from Bayalu Dari
 Bandeya baalina belakaagi from Avala Hejje
 Bisiladarenu Maleyadarenu from Benkiya bale
 Beladinglondu hennagi bandanthe kande from Premanubandha
 Beluvalda madilalli bevara hani biddaga from Beluvaladha Madilalli
 Cheluveya andada mogake from Devara Gudi
 Dundu mallige mathaadeya from Nanna Devaru
 Ee bhaavageete ninagaagi haadide from Onde Guri
 Ellelli Nodali Ninnane Kanuve from Na ninna mareyalare
 Endendu ninnanu maretu from Eradu Kanasu
 E Hrudaya Haadige from Suprabhata
 Gopilola hey gopala from Nari munidare maari
 Halliyadarenu shiva dilliyadarenu shiva from Mayor Muttanna
 Hosa balige nee joteyade from Naa ninna bidalare
 Indu enage govinda from Eradu Kanasu
 Jeeva veene from Hombisilu
 Kanasalu neene manasalu neene from Bayalu Dari
 Kangalu vandane helide from Mugiyada Kathe
 Kumkumaviruvude hanegaagi from Naaniruvude Ninaagaagi
 Mamaravello Kogileyello from Devara Gudi
 Manasu manasu ondadare from Preethi madu Tamasha nodu
 Maneyanu Belagide Indu from Chandanada Gombe
 Mathu chenna mauna chenna from Rama Lakshmana
 Modalane dinave olide from Pavana Ganga
 Muthina hanigalu from Bayasade Banda Bhagya
 Na haadalu neevu aadabeku from Kalla Kulla
 Naa ninna mareyalaare from Naa ninna mareyalaare
 Naliva gulabi hoove from Auto Raja
 Nanna haadu nannadu from Suprabhata
 Nanu neenu ondada mele from  Na ninna bidalare
 Navaduva Nudiye Kannada Nudi from Gandhadha Gudi
 Neera bittu nelada mele from Hombisilu
 Neralanu Kanada lateyante from Avala Hejje
 Notadage nageya meeti from Parasangada Genda Timma
 Omme ninnannu kann tumba from Gaali matu
 Prema preethi nannusiru from Singapoorinalli Raja Kulla
 Tam nam tam nam nannee manasu midiyutide from Eradu Kanasu
 Tarikere yeri mele mooru kari kuri mari from Devara Duddu
 Tera eri ambaradage from Parasangada Genda Timma
 Thareyu baanige thaavare neerige from Biligiriya Banadali
 Thai thai thai thai bangari  from Giri Kanye
 Yuga yugagale saagali from Hrudaya Geethe

Telugu:
Emo emo idhi (Aggi pidigu)
Ennenno Janmalabandham (Puja)
Ningi nela (Puja)
Pujaluseya (Puja)
Veena venuvaina sarigama (Intinti Ramayanam)
Intinti Ramayanam (Intinti Ramayanam)
Chinukula raali (Nalugu Sthambhalaata)
Manasa veena madhugeetam (Panthulamma)
Sirimalleneeva (Panthulamma)
Letha chaligalulu (Moodu mullu)
Neekosam yavvanamantha (Moodu mullu)
Neekallalo Snehamu (Prema Khaidi)
Aakaasam Nee Haddu Ra (Sommokadidhi Sokokadidhi)
Nagamalli Vo Teega Malli Vo (Nagamalli)
Kastandhuko (Rendu Rellu Aaru)
Viraha Veena (Rendu Rellu Aaru)
Parimalinchu Punnamilo (Puli Bebbuli)

Awards and recognition
Rajan–Nagendra are in the same class as Hindi cinema's popular composing duo Shankar-Jaikishen, Laxmikanth Pyarelal and Kalyanji-Anandji. They excelled composing technically flawless and violin-rich orchestral interludes, and enjoyed an equally long innings in the industry.

Their first award film in Kannada was 
 Eradu Kanasu in 1973–74  – State Award for Best Music Director 
 Parasangada Gendethimma in 1978–79 – State Award for Best Music Director  
 He won Nandi Award for Best Music Director - "Panthulamma" (1979)

They won many more awards from private and public associations such as south Indian film fans association, Chitra Rasikara Sangha, Karnataka films directors association, Kannada chalana chitra pathra karthara sanga, Madras Telugu academy, ugadi puraskara award, Abhinandana film awards Hydrabad kalasagar, Madras etc., Throughout south India. Many of their films have celebrated hundred days and silver jubilees.

Deaths 
Nagendra, the younger one of the duo, died of a stroke in Bowring & Lady Curzon Hospitals, Bangalore, on 4 November 2000. He was being treated for hernia, but later developed complications from high blood pressure and diabetes.

Rajan died on 11 October 2020 due to cardiac arrest in Bengaluru. He was also suffering from other age related ailments.

Later activity
Rajan continued his work along with his son R. Ananth Kumar. He published a book titled "Haado Suswara Sangeetha" regarding an innovative notation system for music enthusiasts. They were also conducting music classes by name "Sapthaswaranjali" for vocal enthusiasts on voice culturing and film singing.

Discography

Kannada

Telugu

Tamil
Ellorum Vazhavendum (1962)
Veettukku Veedu Vaasapadi (1979)

Malayalam
Kaattu Rani (1985)
Lady Teacher (1982)

See also
Cinema of Karnataka

References

External links
Rajan Nagendra at Gaana
Rajan Nagendra at Raaga.com
 

Kannada film score composers
Telugu film score composers
Tamil film score composers
Indian musical duos
20th-century Indian composers
Indian male film score composers
20th-century male musicians